Jesse Alan Marsch (born November 8, 1973) is an American professional soccer  coach and former player who was most recently the manager of   club Leeds United. Marsch played 14 seasons as a midfielder in Major League Soccer (MLS) with D.C. United, Chicago Fire, and Chivas USA, winning three league titles and four U.S. Open Cup titles, as well as earning two caps for the United States national team.

In 2010, Marsch retired from his playing career and became a coach, first serving as an assistant with the U.S. national team under Bob Bradley that reached the last 16 of the 2010 FIFA World Cup in South Africa. He then became the inaugural head coach of the Montreal Impact upon its entry to MLS in 2012. In 2015, after a year-long stint as the assistant coach for his alma mater, the Princeton Tigers, Marsch was hired as head coach of the New York Red Bulls and stayed in the role through the first half of the 2018 MLS season. In his first year coaching the team, the Red Bulls won the Supporters' Shield and Marsch was named MLS Coach of the Year. Marsch holds the record for most wins by a coach in franchise history.

In 2018, Marsch was appointed as an assistant coach at German Bundesliga club RB Leipzig under Ralf Rangnick; the team placed third in the league, was runner-up in the German Cup, and competed in the UEFA Europa League. The following season, Marsch was appointed the successor to Marco Rose as coach of Red Bull Salzburg in the Austrian Bundesliga; he led the club to a league and cup double in two consecutive seasons, as Salzburg made successive Champions League group stage appearances for the first time in club history. He returned to RB Leipzig as club coach for the 2021–22 season,  leaving by mutual consent in December and joining Leeds United in February.

Playing career

College
Marsch played college soccer for Princeton University, where he was an All-American in 1995 after scoring 16 goals as a midfielder and forward.

Professional
Marsch was brought in by D.C. United (their assistant coach was his coach at Princeton, Bob Bradley) in the third round of the 1996 MLS College Draft.
Marsch spent the next two seasons with D.C. United, but played in only 15 games. D.C. assistant coach Bob Bradley, named to lead the expansion Chicago Fire, acquired Marsch soon after the Expansion Draft in exchange for A. J. Wood and a second-round pick in the 1998 College Draft. Marsch immediately became a regular in Chicago and remained a mainstay in their lineup through 2005. He helped the Fire to the 1998 MLS Cup, giving him three league championships in three seasons. While with Chicago, he also won the U.S. Open Cup in 1998, 2000 and 2003.

After the 2005 season, Marsch was transferred to Chivas USA, where Bradley was then coaching. At the time, he left the Fire as the club's all-time leader in regular season games played with 200 (he now sits sixth behind C. J. Brown, Logan Pause, Gonzalo Segares, Zach Thornton and Chris Armas). Marsch is one of three players to have played in each of the first 14 seasons of Major League Soccer. On February 5, 2010, he announced his retirement after four seasons with Chivas to enter coaching.

International
Marsch received two caps with the United States national team. His first came as a substitute in a scoreless World Cup qualifier tie away to Trinidad and Tobago on November 11, 2001; the other came on June 2, 2007 in a 4–1 friendly win against China in San Jose, California.

Coaching career

Early career
Following his retirement, Marsch was hired as an assistant to his former college and club coach Bob Bradley with the United States men's national team. Marsch remained with the U.S. program until Bradley's firing in July 2011.

In August 2011, Marsch was unveiled as the first head coach of Major League Soccer expansion franchise Montreal Impact, starting play in 2012. In their first MLS game on March 10, the team lost 2–0 at fellow Canadians Vancouver Whitecaps FC. The club finished in 12th place with 42 points. After that one season, Marsch left the club in November 2012. Though team management had been emphatic about their satisfaction with Marsch's work, the differences in coaching philosophies between Marsch and the management of the club led to an "amicable" split.

New York Red Bulls
In January 2015, Marsch was named head coach of New York Red Bulls, replacing Mike Petke. In his first season at the helm, Marsch led New York to the MLS Supporters' Shield and a club record 18 league victories and 60 points and was named the MLS Coach of the Year. After a successful start to his career, the Red Bulls extended his contract in June 2016, offering Marsch a multi-year deal.

In January 2017, Marsch was linked to taking over for Óscar García as the manager of Austrian club FC Red Bull Salzburg. However, both New York Red Bulls and Red Bull Salzburg denied the reports. In July 2018, Marsch left the Red Bulls as the coach with the most wins in the club's history, with a record of 75–32–44. Chris Armas followed as new head coach.

Assistant at RB Leipzig
Marsch became assistant to RB Leipzig head coach Ralf Rangnick for the 2018–19 season, signing a two-year contract in July 2018. During Marsch's tenure as an assistant for Leipzig, he was tasked with organizing the team's training sessions and preparing them for opponents. Marsch helped lead them to the group stage of the UEFA Europa League, where the team finished third in their group and bowed out of the competition. He further helped Rangnick lead the team to third place in the team's Bundesliga campaign, and to the final of the DFB-Pokal before falling to Bayern Munich in the final. Marsch ultimately left the team after one season to replace Marco Rose as coach of Leipzig's sister club Red Bull Salzburg.

Red Bull Salzburg

Marsch was officially presented as head coach of Red Bull Salzburg on June 6, 2019. In his first season in charge, Marsch led Salzburg to winning the double. The team won the Austrian Bundesliga by winning 68.75% of their games; 12 points ahead of second place Rapid Wien making Marsch the first American coach to win a top flight league title in Europe. The team also won the Austrian Cup 5–0 against Austria Lustenau.

During the 2020–21 season, Marsch led Salzburg to their third successive cup win, Marsch's second as coach, in a 3–0 win against LASK. Salzburg also won the Bundesliga, making it two doubles in a row.

RB Leipzig
Marsch was announced as the new head coach of RB Leipzig starting from the 2021–22 season, replacing Julian Nagelsmann. Marsch won his first competitive match as Leipzig head coach 4–0 against SV Sandhausen in the DFB-Pokal. Leipzig then lost their season's opening Bundesliga match 1–0 to Mainz 05. Marsch won his first Bundesliga match against VfB Stuttgart on matchday two. Under Marsch, Leipzig lost their opening 2021–22 UEFA Champions League fixture 6–3 to Manchester City. On December 5, 2021, Marsch and Leipzig announced that they had mutually agreed to part ways. He finished with a record of seven wins, four draws, and six losses.

Leeds United
On February 28, 2022, Marsch was appointed as head coach of Premier League side Leeds United and signed a three-year deal following the departure of Marcelo Bielsa. He was the third American national to manage in the Premier League, after Bob Bradley and German-born David Wagner. The British press remarked that Marsch would have to combat prejudiced attitudes toward American soccer coaches.

In Marsch's first game as Leeds coach, the team lost 1–0 at Leicester City on March 5; they won at the third attempt eight days later, 2–1 at home to Norwich City. On May 22, Marsch guided Leeds to a 2–1 win away at Brentford to help the club avoid relegation in 17th position; it was the first time since 2011 that a team survived despite being in the relegation zone at the start of the final day. He was sacked as Leeds manager on February 6, 2023, with the club sitting 17th in the table.

Personal life
Marsch was born and raised in Racine, Wisconsin, where he attended Jerome I. Case High School. He and his wife Kim have three children – one daughter and two sons. Apart from his native English, Marsch also speaks fluent German, which he learned at age 44.

Coaching statistics

Honors

Player
D.C. United
MLS Cup: 1996, 1997
Supporters' Shield: 1997
U.S. Open Cup: 1996

Chicago Fire
MLS Cup: 1998
Supporters' Shield: 2003
U.S. Open Cup: 1998, 2000, 2003

Coach
New York Red Bulls
Supporters' Shield: 2015, 2018

Red Bull Salzburg
Austrian Bundesliga: 2019–20, 2020–21
Austrian Cup: 2019–20, 2020–21

Individual
MLS Coach of the Year: 2015

References

External links

1973 births
Living people
Sportspeople from Racine, Wisconsin
Soccer players from Wisconsin
American soccer players
Association football midfielders
Princeton Tigers men's soccer players
All-American men's college soccer players
D.C. United draft picks
D.C. United players
Chicago Fire FC players
Chivas USA players
Major League Soccer players
Major League Soccer All-Stars
United States men's international soccer players
American soccer coaches
CF Montréal coaches
New York Red Bulls coaches
FC Red Bull Salzburg managers
RB Leipzig managers
Leeds United F.C. managers
Austrian Football Bundesliga managers
Bundesliga managers
Premier League managers
American expatriate soccer coaches
American expatriate sportspeople in Canada
American expatriate sportspeople in Austria
American expatriate soccer players in Germany
American expatriate sportspeople in England
Expatriate soccer managers in Canada
Expatriate football managers in Austria
Expatriate football managers in Germany
Expatriate football managers in England